Eucalyptus imitans, commonly known as the Illawarra stringybark, is a species of small tree that is endemic to New South Wales. It has rough, stringy, greyish bark on the trunk and larger branches, lance-shaped, elliptic to egg-shaped or curved adult leaves, flower buds in groups of between nine and fifteen, white flowers and hemispherical fruit. It is found on near-coastal tablelands inland from the south coast.

Description
Flowering occurs from May to June or from October to November and the flowers are white.

Taxonomy and naming
Eucalyptus imitans was first formally described in 1991 by Lawrie Johnson and Ken Hill from a plant found inland from Kangaroo Valley in 1989. The description was published in the journal Telopea. The name imitans is a Latin word meaning "imitating", referring to the resemblance of this species to ''E. oblonga.

Distribution and habitat
The Illawarra stringybark grows in woodland on sandstone on the plateau inland between Tallong and Nerriga.

See also

List of Eucalyptus species

References

Flora of New South Wales
Trees of Australia
imitans
Myrtales of Australia
Plants described in 1991
Taxa named by Lawrence Alexander Sidney Johnson
Taxa named by Ken Hill (botanist)